The teams competing in Group 1 of the 2009 UEFA European Under-21 Championships qualifying competition are Albania, Azerbaijan, Croatia, Faroe Islands, Greece and Italy.

Standings

Key:
Pts Points, Pld Matches played, W Won, D Drawn, L Lost, GF Goals for, GA Goals against, GD Goal Difference

Matches

Goalscorers

1 goal
: Arber Abilaliaj, Elis Bakaj, Nevian Cani, Gerhard Progni, Maringlen Shoshi
: Elnur Abdullayev, Ruslan Abishov
: Ivan Begović, Josip Brezovec, Nikola Kalinić, Matija Smrekar, Josip Tadić, Marin Tomasov
: Arnbjørn Hansen, Einar Hansen, Levi Hanssen, Gudmund Nielsen,  Magnus Olsen
: Elini Dimoutsos, Sokratis Papastathopoulos, Theodoros Tripotseris
: Mario Balotelli, Alessio Cerci, Luca Cigarini, Domenico Criscito, Arturo Lupoli, Marco Motta, Nicola Pozzi
Own goals
: Ruslan Abishov, Rahid Amirguliyev, Namiq Yusifov

Group 1
Under